The 2013 Columbia Lions baseball team represents Columbia University in the 2013 NCAA Division I baseball season.  The Lions play their home games at Robertson Field at Satow Stadium at the northern tip of Manhattan in New York, New York. The team is coached by Brett Boretti, leading his eighth season at Columbia.

The Lions won the Lou Gehrig Division, then swept  in the 2013 Ivy League Baseball Championship Series to claim the Lions' 11th Ivy League crown, and first since 2008.

Roster

Coaches

Schedule

References

Columbia Lions baseball seasons
Columbia Lions
Ivy League baseball champion seasons
2013 NCAA Division I baseball tournament participants
2013 in sports in New York City